Road to the Big House is a 1947 American crime drama film directed by Walter Colmes. It was based on a script by Aubrey Wisberg.

It was also known as The Dark Road.

Plot

Cast
John Shelton as Eddie Clark
Ann Doran as Agnes Clark
Guinn "Big Boy" Williams as Butch McQuinn

Production
The film was made by a new company, Somerset Pictures, established in 1947 by Walter Combes, Solly Levenstn and Jake Milstein. It followed their first film The Burning Cross.

Somerset announced their third film would be about teachers' salaries. But it appears to have not been made.

References

External links

1947 films
American crime drama films
Lippert Pictures films
Films directed by Walter Colmes
1947 crime drama films
American black-and-white films
Films with screenplays by Aubrey Wisberg
1940s English-language films
1940s American films